Roccavaldina (Sicilian: Roccavaddina) is a comune (municipality) in the Metropolitan City of Messina in the Italian region Sicily, located about  east of Palermo and about  west of Messina.

Roccavaldina borders the following municipalities: Monforte San Giorgio, Rometta, Spadafora, Torregrotta, Valdina, Venetico.

References

Cities and towns in Sicily